Hialeah station may refer to:

Hialeah station (Metrorail), a train station served by Metrorail in Hialeah, Florida
Hialeah Seaboard Air Line Railway Station, a former train station in Hialeah, Florida